Sir John Harvey (died 1646) was a Crown Governor of Virginia. He was appointed to the position on 26 March 1628 by Charles I of England. In 1635 he was suspended and impeached by the Council of Virginia (who named John West as a temporary replacement), and he returned to England. He claimed a conspiracy to change the charter of the colony by John Wolstenholme was 
the reason for the failures of his administration. 

Charles I restored him to his post  in 1636. He returned to Virginia in January 1637 and served until November 1639. The captain, officers, and sailors of the ship that transported the governor to Virginia in 1635 sued in Admiralty court for their pay. His government has been described as tyrannical and Harvey himself has been called "an obnoxious ruler" and was generally held to be unpopular. In 1639, Harvey was replaced as governor by Sir Francis Wyatt.

He owned Boldrup Plantation.

See also
Colony of Virginia
Governor's Palace
History of Virginia

References

External links
John Harvey's Residence
 Biography at Encyclopedia Virginia

Colonial governors of Virginia
Virginia colonial people
1646 deaths
Year of birth unknown
Officials impeached by the Thirteen Colonies